"Now and Forever" is a song written, produced and performed by American singer-songwriter Richard Marx. The song was also used in 1994 film The Getaway starring Kim Basinger and Alec Baldwin and directed by Roger Donaldson.

Song information
Marx wrote "Now and Forever" about his wife, actress Cynthia Rhodes. He has been quoted as saying: "I was working on the fourth album and realized I had not written a song addressing our relationship since we had gotten married and had three kids. I think this is one of those songs which was unique in that the verses are so specific to our relationship."

Chart performance
Taken as the first single from Marx's album Paid Vacation, the song was his ninth (and final, to date) song to reach the top ten on the US Billboard Hot 100 chart, where it peaked at number seven. The song remained in the top 40 for 23 weeks. It was more successful in Cash Box magazine, spending two weeks in the top three. It was also Marx's biggest hit on the Billboard adult contemporary chart, where it went to number one and remained at the top for eleven weeks. Elsewhere, the single reached the top 10 in Canada and Norway and the top 20 in Sweden, Australia, and the United Kingdom. It missed the latter milestone in New Zealand, peaking at number 21. In Canada, "Now and Forever" was the most successful adult contemporary song of 1994, topping the RPM Adult Contemporary chart for seven weeks.

Charts

Weekly charts

Year-end charts

"Ahora y Siempre"
Marx also recorded a Spanish language version of the song as "Ahora y Siempre" for the Spanish market.

References

1993 songs
1994 singles
Richard Marx songs
Songs written by Richard Marx
Rock ballads
Capitol Records singles
1990s ballads